Regina Bartholomew is an American lawyer, politician and mother of three, originating from Louisiana. On June 9, 2011, Bartholomew, a Democrat, announced her candidacy for New Orleans Judge of Civil District Court, Division B. Bartholomew faced attorney Ellen Hazeur in the October 22, 2011, election. Bartholomew was successful in this election, winning 63.31% of votes. Bartholomew has been endorsed by the New Orleans Times-Picayune. Most recently, Bartholomew ran against Laurie A. White for a seat in division D on the Louisiana 4th Circuit Court of Appeals in 2016, with a successful result of 65.5%.

References

Living people
Louisiana Democrats
Politicians from New Orleans
Lawyers from New Orleans
Year of birth missing (living people)